Bertha Sneck (Chinese Name: Shǐ Kè 史克; born 3 December 1916 in Maynard; died 1 March 2010 in Beijing) was an American translator and political activist who lived in China.

Biography
Bertha Sneck moved to China in 1948 with her husband William H. Hinton. Their daughter Carma Hinton was born there. Sneck worked from 1949 to 1963 in the Foreign Languages Institute of Beijing and from 1964 to 1972 for the Newspaper "China in Pictures".

In June 1966 she and three other Americans – Ann Tompkins, Joan Hinton and "Sid" Erwin Engst – wrote a large-character poster (dàzìbào 大字报), in which they demanded to be treated exactly the same way that their Chinese colleagues were and to be allowed to engage in political activities. A copy of the poster was given to Mao Zedong, who praised it.

From 1972 to her retirement, Bertha Sneck worked for the newspapers Beijing Perspective and Chinese Literature. In 1984 the State Council recognized her for exceptional service.

References
Dao-yuan Chou: Silage Choppers and Snake Spirits. The Lives and Struggles of Two Americans in Modern China. IBON Books, 2009.
 Woei Lien Chong: China's Great Proletarian Cultural Revolution. Master Narratives and Post-Mao Counternarratives. Rowman & Littlefield, 2002, .
Ann Tompkins, Lincoln Cushing: Chinese Posters. Art From the Great Proletarian Cultural Revolution. Chronicle Books, 2007, .

External links
 北京周报社： 北京周报社外国专家史克逝世 Fremdsprachenamt Chinas, 10 March 2010.
 中国外文局郭晓勇：打造传播中国的"出海之船" China.org.cn, 10 September 2009.
 王立礼：我的美国老师史克 http://www.xinyifanyi.com/news.asp?id=1396, 29 January 2013
 《牛虻》在中国的流行与误读（二） http://www.shzgh.org/renda/node5661/node5663/node15864/userobject1ai1767668.html, 21 March 2016
 走近北外 | 北京外国语大学老一辈英语教育家们的故事（连载六：史克、陈梅洁） http://mp.weixin.qq.com/s?__biz=MzA5MDQzMTYwNg==&mid=400167521&idx=1&sn=4122b199d0ea2031084943f0c13b8a6f#rd, 21 March 2016
 Telegram from Bertha Sneck to Shirley Graham Du Bois, August 30, 1963. http://credo.library.umass.edu/view/full/mums312-b155-i345, 24 May 2016

Footnotes
↑ Chou 2009, S. 350; 毛泽东：对四位美国专家的一张大字报的批语 (8. September 1966). In: 《建国以来毛泽东文稿》. Beijing: 中央文献出版社, 1998, Vol. 12, p. 126f.,  and 毛泽东：对四位美国专家的一张大字报的批示 (29 August 1966). In: 《毛泽东思想万岁》 Vols. 1961–1968, p. 350, Beijing: Samisdat, (2005?).

1916 births
American translators
2010 deaths
20th-century translators
American expatriates in China
American women writers
Hinton family
21st-century American women